Arctander can refer to:
Arctander (family)
Sofus Arctander, Norwegian Minister of the Interior 1884–1885.
Arctander Township, Minnesota, located in Kandiyohi County, United States.
Tundra a.k.a. Arctander (musician)